9 Rides is a 2016 American film written and directed by Matthew A. Cherry and starring Dorian Missick, Omar Dorsey and Robinne Lee.

Cast
Dorian Missick as Driver
Omar Dorsey as Uber Pool Man
Robinne Lee as Girlfriend

Production
The film was shot in less than week in November 2015 and entirely using iPhone 6s in 4K quality.

Release
The film premiered at South by Southwest on March 11, 2016.

Reception
Shannon M. Houston of Paste rated the film a 7.5.

References

External links